Mölten is a comune (municipality) in South Tyrol in northern Italy, located about  northwest of Bolzano.

Geography

The municipality of Mölten contains the frazioni (subdivisions, mainly villages and hamlets) Schlaneid (Salonetto), Verschneid (Frassineto), and Versein (Vallesina).

Mölten borders the following municipalities: Gargazon, Burgstall, Jenesien, Sarntal, Terlan and Vöran.

History

Coat-of-arms
The emblem is a pot with three feet and an or handle, from which emerge three lilies with vert stems on  gules. The sign is based on that of the Hafner family, who lived in the village, which was granted by Archduke Ferdinand of Austria in 1523. The emblem was adopted in 1969.

Society

Linguistic distribution
According to the 2011 census, 96.11% of the population speak German, 3.57% Italian and 0.31% Ladin as first language.

Demographic evolution

References

External links
 Homepage of the municipality

Municipalities of South Tyrol